Five-year plan may refer to:

Nation plans 
Five-year plans of the Soviet Union, a series of nationwide centralized economic plans in the Soviet Union
Five-Year Plans of Argentina
Five-Year Plans of Bhutan, a series of national economic development plans created by the government of Bhutan since 1961
Five-year plans of China (PRC), a series of social and economic development initiatives
Five-Year Plans of Ethiopia
Five-Year Plans of India, which existed from 1947 to 2017
Five-Year Plans of Nepal
Five-Year Plans of Pakistan, centralized economic plans and targets as part of economic development initiatives
Five-Year Plans of Romania, economic development projects in Communist Romania, largely inspired by the Soviet model
Five-Year Plans of South Korea, an economic development project of South Korea
Five-Year Plans of Vietnam, a series of economic development initiatives
First Malayan Five-Year Plan, the first economic development plan launched by the Malayan government, just before independence in 1957
 Five years plan to governing aborigines – Japanese plan in the early twentieth century to control the native population of Taiwan

Other uses
 F.Y.P, punk rock band

See also
Four Year Plan, a series of economic reforms created by the Nazi Party
Economic development
Economic planning
Planned economy

Five-year plans